Asclepias nyctaginifolia is a species of milkweed known by the common name Mojave milkweed. It is native to the southwestern United States from California to New Mexico, where it grows mainly in desert habitat. This is a perennial herb growing up to about half a meter in maximum height when erect, but often bending or drooping. The thick leaves are oval to lance-shaped and arranged in opposite pairs about the stem. The leaves and stem are generally slightly hairy. The inflorescence is a dense umbel up to 8 centimeters wide and packed with pink-tinted pale green flowers. The fruit is a large follicle up to 9 centimeters long.

External links
Jepson Manual Treatment
Southwest Environmental Information Network 

nyctaginifolia
Flora of the California desert regions
Flora of Arizona
Flora of Nevada
Flora of New Mexico
Natural history of the Mojave Desert
Butterfly food plants
Flora without expected TNC conservation status